HZM may refer to:

 Masayuki Hiizumi, Japanese musician
 Herzogtum (abbreviated Hzm.), the German equivalent of a duchy
 Helmholtz Zentrum München, German research centre
 Hong Kong–Zhuhai–Macau Bridge (or HZM Bridge)
 Croatian Railway Museum (Hrvatski željeznički muzej)